Saint-Laurent-des-Arbres is a commune in the Gard department in southern France.

Population

References

Further reading

External links

Saint-Laurent-des-Arbres Tourist Office
Saint-Laurent-des-Arbres Town Hall

Communes of Gard